SPC Group is a South Korean food company based in Seoul that manufactures food, bread and confectionery products. Sangmidang, the precursor of Samlip General Food was founded in 1945, and the group was launched in 2004. SPC Group is one of the oldest brands in the confectionery and bakery industry in Korea. Its catering centers are based in Seongnam, Gyeonggi-do.

In addition to Samlip General Food and Shany, SPC Group has market-leading franchise brands such as Paris Baguette (Bakery) and BR Korea (Donuts and Ice-cream) as subsidiaries. The company also has SPL, SPC Capital, Samlip GFS and Mildawon, to name a few, as subsidiary companies, further broadening business scope with overseas establishments in the United States, China, Vietnam, and Singapore.

"SPC" stands for "Samlip/Shany," "Paris Croissant," and "Companies (including BR Korea and other subsidiaries of today and tomorrow)."

History
In 1945, Hur Chang-sung started a small confectionery outfit named Sangmidang. In 1959 the business was renamed to Samlip. A couple of years later, Samlip began to produce bread and biscuits. His business was aligned with the government policies. Their first product was a cream filled pastry. Samlip's quality was high for sales in US military camps. In the late 1960s, there were many competitors including Koryo Dang Bakery, Tae Geuk Dang and New York Bakery. In 1972, Hur set up another arm called Shany to specialize in High-end cakes. Eventually, Hur's son, Hur Young-in oversaw Shany's operation and took over Samlip group.

Labour-related issues

Employment of bakers 
In September 2017, SPC was found to have illegally dispatched 5,000 bakers who were hired through partner firms by the Ministry of Employment and Labor (MOEL). These bakers were instructed directly by SPC Group. Such employment practices usually helped the company involved to reduce hiring costs as they would not need to give these dispatched labor benefits such as paid vacation or health insurance. MOEL directed SPC Group to employ the bakers directly, but , the group has yet to resolve the issue, having not implemented an agreement under which the 5,000 bakers would be employed by a 51-percent-owned subsidiary.

Workplace safety 
On October 15, 2022, a 23-year-old worker died on the floor of a bread factory affiliated with SPC. The worker was caught in an industrial mixer. Public opinions about the group turned soured after allegations that the company put a screen around the mixer involved and expected the other workers to continue working on the floor. Officials from MOEL went to investigate and stop the machines without safety locks. The company did so as the Ministry only initially ordered a suspension of work on the mixer. Operations on the production floor was suspended the following day after the Ministry recommended further as such. This triggered calls for boycott of the group's brands nationwide. The company also issued a statement initially stating that the deceased worker was working "in a team of two"; however, testimony by her colleagues refuted the statement. The deceased worker had been "repeatedly putting in as much as 15 to 20 kg of raw materials into a 120 cm-high machine alone while standing in front of the machine", while the alleged teammate was actually working on other sandwich ingredients. On October 24, 2022, it was revealed that the group had more than 100 industrial accidents per year lodged with the Korea Occupational Safety and Health Agency since 2019.

Subsidiaries

Samlip General Food
Samlip General Food is headquartered in Siheung. Samlip General Food, formerly known as Sangmidang, was established in October 1945 by Hur Chang-sung, and is a forerunner of the SPC Group. It makes bread and confectionery products. Its manufacturing centers are based in Jeongwang-dong Siheung Gyeonggi-do and Daegu. The company's Core Identity was further reinforced through the acquisition of Shany, a high-end cake brand established in 1972. Samlip is also diversifying its business into tteok (Korean rice cake) and restaurant franchising.

Shany
The company is headquartered in Seongnam. It was established on October 15, 1972 under the previous name Hankook International Foods. It makes bread and confectionery products. Its manufacturing centers are based in Sangdaewon-dong Seongnam Gyeonggi-do, Gwangju and Daegu. The company was incorporated a group member by Samlip General Food.

Paris Croissant

Paris Croissant is a South Korean franchise bakery that utilizes authentic French baking. In 1988, Paris Croissant launched Paris Baguette, which grew into a top bakery café franchise brand in Korea. With the expansion into the Chinese market in 2004, the company began going global and now has local subsidiaries in the US, Vietnam, and Singapore. Other F&B brands include Paris Croissant Café (premium bakery café), Pascucci (Italian espresso café), LINA's and Tamati (sandwich), Passion5 (upscale dessert gallery), L’atelier (café restaurant), and Jamba Juice (smoothie). The company is also rapidly gaining traction in the restaurant industry with brands such as Queens Park (organic), LaGrilla (Italian), The World Vine (wine), Parlour (European casual cuisine)and Vera Napoli. 2013 Revenue of US$1.51 Billion. In the United States, Paris Baguette is named as Paris Baguette Café. Most of Paris Baguette Café's chains are located near the Los Angeles metropolitan area and is substantially increasing ever since 2008. It has stores in California, New York, New Jersey, Massachusetts and Pennsylvania.

BR Korea
BR Korea is a joint venture established by the SPC Group and Dunkin' Brands, Inc. in 1985. In the first year, the company launched Baskin Robbins, cultivating the premium ice cream market in Korea. In 1993, BR Korea launched Dunkin' Donuts, leading the way to dominating the donut segment of the Korean baked goods market. Due to much continuous growth, BR Korea now operates over 1800 Baskin Robbins and Dunkin' Donuts brand stores. Ice cream is produced in BR Korea's Eumseung plant with a certified Hazard Analysis Critical Control Points system (HACCP), and coffee beans are roasted in BR Korea's large-scale roasting center.

Other subsidiaries
 SPC Logistics
 SPC Cloud
 SPC Networks
 SPC Capital
 Samlip GFS
 Sungil Chemical
 Mildawon
 S dairy Foods

Brands

 Samlip
 Shany
 Bizeun
 Eggslut (Singapore)
 Paris Croissant
 Paris Baguette
 Shake Shack (Korea)
 Baskin Robbins (Korea)
 Dunkin' Donuts (Korea)
 Caffè Pascucci
 Jamba Juice (Korea)
 Passion 5

 Lagrillia
 Queens Park
 L'atelier
 Parlour
 Vera Napoli
 Lina's
 Tamati
 The World Wine
 strEAT

See also
Economy of South Korea
Hur Young-in

External links
SPC Group

References

 
Food manufacturers of South Korea
Manufacturing companies based in Seoul
Food and drink companies established in 1945
South Korean brands
1945 establishments in Korea